Maksym Ihorovych Pashkovskyi (born 24 March 1983) is a Ukrainian politician currently serving as a People's Deputy of Ukraine representing Ukraine's 11th electoral district as a member of Servant of the People since 29 August 2019. He is a member of the Verkhovna Rada Committee on Transport and Infrastructure.

Biography 
2005 - junior lawyer in a law firm in Kyiv. 2007 - lawyer in the production holding company "Carbon". 2009 - registered a private individual, started a private practice. 2012 - founded the social project "Legal Clinic" Ambulance "Since 2013 - works in the field of IT-business.

In 2019, Pashkovskyi was elected People's Deputy of Ukraine in Ukraine's 11th electoral district (Vinnytsia and Vinnytsia Raion) from Servant of the People. At the time of the election: Director of Pancher Solutions LLC, non-partisan. Lives in Vinnytsia.

In 2021, the Volnovakha City Military-Civil Administration was awarded a commemorative medal "For Charitable Activity".

References 

1983 births
Living people
Ninth convocation members of the Verkhovna Rada
Politicians from Vinnytsia
Servant of the People (political party) politicians
Ukrainian lawyers
National University of Kyiv-Mohyla Academy alumni